A secret history (or shadow history) is a revisionist interpretation of either fictional or real history which is claimed to have been deliberately suppressed, forgotten, or ignored by established scholars. "Secret history" is also used to describe an alternative interpretation of documented facts which portrays a drastically different motivation or history from established historical events.

Secret histories of the real world

Originally, secret histories were designed as non-fictional, revealing or claiming to reveal the truth behind the "spin": one such example is The Secret History of the Mongols. Secret histories can range from standard historical revisionism with proper critical reexamination of historical facts to negative historical revisionism wherein facts are deliberately omitted, suppressed or distorted.

The quintessential example secret history is the Anecdota of Procopius of Caesarea (known for centuries as the Secret History). It was discovered, centuries after it was written, in the Vatican Library and published in 1623, although its existence was already known from the Suda, which referred to it as the Anekdota ("the unpublished composition"). The Secret History covers roughly the same years as the first seven books of the History of Justinian's Wars and appears to have been written after they were published. Current consensus generally dates it to 550 or 558, possibly as late as 562. It portrays the reign of the Roman Emperor Justinian I to the great disadvantage of the Emperor, the Emperor's wife, and some of his imperial court.

Fictional secret histories
Secret history is sometimes used in a long-running science fiction or fantasy universe to preserve continuity with the present by reconciling paranormal, anachronistic, or otherwise notable but unrecorded events with what actually happened in known history; for instance, in the Star Trek universe, Greg Cox's novels The Eugenics Wars: The Rise and Fall of Khan Noonien Singh cast the devastating Eugenics Wars of the 1990s (still well into the future when first mentioned in an episode from 1967) as shadow wars most people never knew about, in which such real-life events from that era as the Smiling Buddha nuclear test, the Yugoslav Wars during the 1990s, and the 1992 Los Angeles riots were all part of one wider conflict.

Secret history thrillers
A certain type of thriller can be defined as secret history. In such novels, a daring spy, assassin or commando nearly carries out a coup which would have drastically changed history as we know it. Since this is not alternate history but a secret event in our own history, the reader knows in advance that this attempt would be foiled, that all persons in the know would be sworn to secrecy and all evidence be consigned to a top secret archive, where supposedly it still is. Nevertheless, the plot fascinates many readers who want to see how close history comes to being changed (usually very, very close) and exactly how the attempt would be foiled.

Two highly successful novels are considered to have started this subgenre:

 Eye of the Needle by Ken Follett: a German spy in 1944 nearly succeeds in foiling D-Day;
 The Day of the Jackal by Frederick Forsyth: an assassin nearly succeeds in killing Charles De Gaulle, president of France, in 1963.

These two novels set the framework for many later books: following step by step both the fiendishly clever, competent and ruthless perpetrator in carrying out his design and the equally clever and competent hunter, hot on his heels throughout the book, but who would catch up with him only at the very end. Typically, historical figures – including very famous ones – appear in some key scenes, but are not major actors.

Many other novels of this type followed, most of them with World War II backgrounds. Follet himself published at least two others:
 The Key to Rebecca: a German spy in Cairo nearly succeeds in letting Erwin Rommel win at El Alamein.
 The Man from St. Petersburg: a Russian anarchist in 1914 Britain nearly succeeds, by assassinating a key envoy of the Tsar, in averting the First World War.

Works of other writers fitting within this type include:
 An Exchange of Eagles by Owen Sela: In 1940, senior officers of the German Abwehr and the American Military Intelligence make a secret deal to simultaneously assassinate Adolf Hitler and Franklin Roosevelt with the assumption that they would be replaced by Hermann Göring and Henry A. Wallace - who would make peace and prevent World War II from further escalating.
 Enigma by Robert Harris: an embittered code-breaker nearly betrays to Nazi Germany the vital and closely guarded secret that the Allies are able to read its secret messages.
 In the 2006 historical detective novel, The Janissary Tree by Jason Goodwin, a power-mad Ottoman general in 1836 nearly succeeds in overthrowing Sultan Mahmud II and proclaiming a republic almost 90 years in advance of Atatürk.
 In the thriller The Redbreast by Jo Nesbø, a former World War II Norwegian collaborator with the Nazi occupation nearly succeeds in assassinating the Norwegian Crown Prince.
 Stalag Texas, also by John Lee: escaped German prisoners nearly succeed in destroying the American nuclear laboratory at Los Alamos.
 The Eagle Has Landed by Jack Higgins: German commandos nearly succeed in kidnapping British Prime Minister Winston Churchill out of wartime England.
 The First Assassin by John J. Miller: In 1861, a hitman hired by secessionists tries to murder Abraham Lincoln at the start of the American Civil War.
 The Night Letter by Paul Spike: In 1940, Nazi agents nearly succeed in blackmailing U.S. President Franklin D. Roosevelt into not running for a third term.
 The Ninth Man by John Lee: a few years later, a Nazi agent penetrates the White House and nearly succeeds in assassinating Roosevelt.
 The Romanov Succession by Brian Garfield: taking advantage of the 1941 Nazi attack on the Soviet Union, Russian exiles attempt to assassinate Soviet premier Joseph Stalin and restore the monarchy.

Different types of secret history thriller include:

 An interesting example of a science-fiction secret history novel can be found in the BBC Doctor Who Past Doctor Adventures novel Imperial Moon, which sees the Fifth Doctor and his companions Vislor Turlough and Kamelion learn about a secret trip to the Moon by the British Imperial Spacefleet in 1878. On first hearing of the expedition, the Doctor notes that Victorian science could have built a structurally sound spaceship capable of going to the Moon, with the only thing beyond them being a conventional propulsion system; the events of the novel reveal that information about how to create the ships' engines was secretly provided by an alien race trapped on the Moon who sought to escape to Earth. At the novel's conclusion, after the alien race decimates the spaceport where the ships returned to Earth before being defeated by the Doctor and his companions, the Doctor arranges for Queen Victoria to cancel the space program as he recognises that Victorian Britain is not psychologically ready to travel in space, with all records of the expedition being destroyed apart from the expedition leader's diary, which he entrusts to the Doctor for safe keeping.
 F. Paul Wilson's Repairman Jack novels and the Adversary Cycle are both part of a "Secret History of the World" fantasy cycle that spans events from the prehistory to the early 21st Century. The underlying secret is a struggle between "The Ally", a force or being that "collects" worlds with intelligent life, and "The Otherness", a rather Lovecraftian entity which hates worlds with "normal" life and wishes to terrorize, consume, and destroy such life, altering those worlds to resemble its presumed home universe. A large number of apparently unrelated stories and novels by Wilson are part of the Secret History.
 In The Berkut by Joseph Heywood, Adolf Hitler did not really commit suicide in 1945; it was a double who died together with Eva Braun. The real Hitler tried to escape from Berlin, was captured by Soviet commandos after the long chase making most of the book, and was secretly kept under horrible and degrading conditions in the Kremlin basement until the death of Joseph Stalin in 1953, when he was secretly executed.
 Many of the "Blackford Oakes" spy novels, by conservative writer William F. Buckley, Jr., which are secret-history thrillers claiming that historical events considered to have been setbacks for the United States were actually brilliant strategic coups by the CIA which were merely allowed to look like defeats for security purposes, or at least were the product of the US's moral superiority. For instance, in Who's on First, Oakes deliberately chooses not to stop the Soviet Union from launching Sputnik ahead of the otherwise-superior US satellite program, in order to protect the life of a Soviet contact (and thus the seeming Soviet technological triumph was actually authorized by a US agent, who allowed it to happen); in Marco Polo, if You Can, Oakes is the real-life U2 pilot Gary Powers, and allows himself to be captured while flying over the Soviet Union in order to create a cover story for a secret US intelligence operation (and thus the U2 incident was actually planned from the start, Gary Powers was not shot down by the Soviet military but deliberately set up his own capture, and U.S. President Dwight D. Eisenhower's subsequent humiliation by Soviet Premier Nikita Khrushchev never happened).
 The Leader and the Damned by Colin Forbes: Adolf Hitler was assassinated in 1943 but his death was kept secret and the man who led Nazi Germany in the last two years of the war was a double. This book also provides a detailed view on the role of Martin Bormann in the Nazi leadership and of his eventual fate, completely at odds with the official historical record. 
 The mystery series by Elliott Roosevelt in which his mother, Eleanor Roosevelt, is the detective – placing murder mysteries in the Franklin D. Roosevelt White House and other actual locations and involving many historical persons in the fictional events depicted. In one book of the series, Murder at the Chateau, Eleanor Roosevelt is involved not only in a murder mystery but also in a high-level secret conference in Occupied France, which nearly ends with a diplomatic deal to end World War II in 1941.
 The plot of Clive Cussler's Night Probe! is based on the assumption that on the eve of World War I in 1914, a secret treaty was signed between the British Prime Minister, H. H. Asquith, with the cooperation of King George V, and US President Woodrow Wilson – to sell Canada to the United States for the sum of one billion dollars. The treaty was aborted at the time and reference to it erased from all official records – to resurface explosively in 1989 (as future date at the time of writing).
 The Proteus Operation by James P. Hogan tells the most closely guarded secret of World War II: in 1939 there arrived in New York City a group of time-travelers from a future timeline in which the Nazis won the war and took over most of the world. The arrivals secretly contacted Franklin Roosevelt and Winston Churchill and provided invaluable information about how the Germans won in their history – which enabled the Allies to do better this time and win the war. This time-travel secret was only known to  Roosevelt and Churchill, to a few of their close advisers such as Harry Hopkins, and to a few scientists such as Albert Einstein. After the victory in 1945, all who knew it were sworn to secrecy – and strictly kept it until their deaths – and all records destroyed, this secret considered too explosive to be ever told.
 When published in 1903, Erskine Childers' The Riddle of the Sands was mainly a cautionary tale about the then real possibility of war between Britain and Germany. But the very belated 1998 sequel The Shadow in the Sands by Sam Llewellyn transformed it into a full-fledged secret history. It asserts that in 1902–1903 Imperial Germany prepared a meticulous plan for a large-scale invasion of England, supervised by Kaiser Wilhelm II who took personal part in some of the preparations. The German invasion was foiled at the very last moment by a small band of courageous Britons who infiltrated Germany and carried out a series of daring acts of arson and sabotage, undertaken with the risk of being hanged out of hand if caught, and succeeding against all odds in derailing Kaiser Wilhelm's carefully prepared invasion plan – so that a quarter of a million German soldiers who were poised to board the invasion fleet just returned to barracks. In the aftermath the German and British governments tacitly agreed to pretend none of this ever happened. The Germans wanted to keep it secret, because it failed; the British, because the authorities in Britain had ignored all warnings and did nothing to avert the invasion, and those who did avert it were private British citizens acting on their own without any government sanction or support. Thus, the whole affair remained secret history, even when Britain and Germany did go to war eleven years later.  
 XPD by Len Deighton: Winston Churchill was far more of an appeaser than official history records, and in June 1940 he had a secret meeting with Hitler to discuss peace on the basis of recognizing the German domination of Europe; decades later, the documents recording this shameful secret are the subject of an intensive and deadly power struggle.

Fictional "secret" versions of historical events
 Alexandre Dumas' last major work, The Knight of Sainte-Hermine, asserts that it was the novel's protagonist who killed the British Admiral Horatio Nelson and that the true circumstances of Nelson's death were kept secret for reasons which form part of the book's plot. 
 Bill Walsh's Tales from the Black Chamber posits that US President Calvin Coolidge secretly established a government agency called "The Black Chamber", its mission being to fight demons, vampires, werewolves, and any other supernatural beings who threaten the United States or the world in general. The foundation of this agency closely coincided with Coolidge appointing J. Edgar Hoover to head what would become the FBI, but the creation and existence of the Black Chamber was and is kept completely secret, even a century later. But it does exist in our present time, and its hands are full.
Donna Tartt used the phrase for the title of her debut novel (The Secret History), which recounts the story of a group of classics students at an elite college in New England who engage in ritual murder – and subsequently bury the story. The plot is told via unreliable narration and an inverted detective format.
 Dumas' earlier and more well-known work, The Three Musketeers, provides a detailed and entirely fictional account of the background to the 1628 assassination of George Villiers, 1st Duke of Buckingham by the junior officer John Felton. At the time and up to the present, Felton's act was considered as part of the turbulent 17th century English politics. As depicted by Dumas, however, the assassination of Buckingham was the result of a convoluted plot hatched by the French Cardinal Richelieu, while Felton himself was unaware of being manipulated by Richelieu's female agent. 
 Elizabeth Bear's Promethean Age series constitutes a massive secret history of Elizabethan England, with considerable fantasy elements. Among other things the series asserts that Edward de Vere, 17th Earl of Oxford was a secret illegitimate son of Queen Elizabeth I; that Sir Francis Walsingham, the Queen's spymaster, did not die in 1590 as history records but lived in secret for another five years; that playwrights Christopher Marlowe, William Shakespeare and Ben Jonson were all secret agents of the Queen and underwent dangerous missions in her service, in addition to their theatrical activities; that the plays of all three had profound secret political and magical meanings; that Shakespeare and Marlowe were lovers, and homoerotic elements in Shakespeare's Sonnets were dedicated to Marlowe; that Edmund Spenser's The Faerie Queene was not a fictional work but was based on a true Kingdom of Faerie, whose Queen had a secret pact of mutual help with the English Queen Elizabeth; that Christopher Marlowe was not assassinated in 1593 as history records but was taken into Faerie where he became the lover of the witch Morgan le Fay; and that Shakespeare had also visited Faerie and personally met with Puck and other supposedly legendary characters depicted in A Midsummer Night's Dream.
 Gore Vidal's novel Creation, purporting to disclose many facts on Greco-Persian Wars that were not known to Herodotus, asserts that the Persian King Darius planned a major military campaign in India, with the aim of annexing the entire Gangetic Plain to the Persian Empire. But the Greeks, entangling the Persians in a major war on their other flank and proving a tougher opponent than the Persians counted on, caused that Indian campaign to be aborted. Thus, according to Vidal, the Greeks unknowingly exerted great influence on India's history and – since this was the Buddha's lifetime – also on the character of Buddhism, a major world religion.
 Many of Tim Powers's novels are secret histories. For example, his 1987 novel On Stranger Tides had a different interpretation of pirate Blackbeard's death at Ocracoke Inlet. After finding the Fountain of Youth, Blackbeard planned to go in battle and knew it would lead to his death, which he wanted to be a widely known event. After Blackbeard's death, his head was severed and hung on the bowsprit, in which the pirate's blood fell into the sea, thereby letting the effects of the Fountain work. Blackbeard's soul would gain a new body, where he would assume a new identity as "Edmund Morcilla" until he was killed again, for once and all, by the book's protagonist, Jack Shandy. Powers's 2001 novel Declare presents a secret history of the Cold War, with the US and the UK jousting with the Soviet Union over the control of powerful supernatural forces.
The Assassin's Creed video game franchise is built around a conspiracy-laden story involving a "New World Order" organization that took the form of the Knights Templar. According to the game's fiction, many historical figures were secretly Templars, manipulating history and those around them in a quest for power. They were opposed by the Assassins, another secret order that considered themselves defenders of humanity's free will. It is implied, and confirmed in Assassin's Creed II, that certain powerful artifacts that the Templars sought in their quest for power were remnants of a secret "First Civilization", the basis for most real-world religion and mythology. The true history of the world has long been lost and/or intentionally obscured, possibly by the Templars.
 The background of Ben Aaronovitch's Rivers of London series of contemporary fantasy detective thrillers includes the assertion that Isaac Newton, in addition to his well-known scientific achievements, was also a powerful wizard who codified the basic principles of magic. Unlike Newton's writings on other subjects, his Philosophiae Naturalis Principia Artes Magicis (Latin for "Natural Philosophy Principles of The Magical Arts") was never made known to the general public. However, copies of Newton's book, as of other books on magic, were kept at a secret section of the Bodleian Library in the University of Oxford, and it remained the basic text for practitioners of magic into the twenty-first century. The same series also assumes that, in addition to the various weapons deployed, World War II had also been fought by magical means, with Nazi Germany, Britain, the United States and the Soviet Union each raising its own secret corps of warrior-wizards. Specifically, official World War II histories omit all mention of a major battle fought in January 1945 at Ettersberg, Germany – where thousands of British wizards gave their lives in the effort to destroy a secret magical facility, from where Nazi wizards were seeking to unleash vampires and other nasty magical surprises upon the world. Scattered in the series are minor other tidbits of secret history: The practice of magic flourished among the court ladies of Caroline of Ansbach; during the War of 1812, British wizards trained Tecumseh's medicine men in up-to-date Newtonian magic, for which American wizards kept a grudge even centuries later; John Maynard Keynes, though not practicing magic himself, was associated with the British wizards and helped them locate various magical manuscripts; in 2009, American wizards trying a magical operation as part of the Iraq War suffered a major fiasco at Falluja which was covered up but got their contract with the US Army terminated.  
 The books of Steve Berry often have secret history elements which are critical to their plots. For example, The Jefferson Key, part of Berry's Cotton Malone series, is based on the assumption that all four assassinations of a US President (Abraham Lincoln in 1865, James A. Garfield in 1881, William McKinley in 1901, and John F. Kennedy in 1963) were in fact organized by a secret "Commonwealth" of pirates (or "privateers"), founded during the American Revolution, which still exists into the 21st century and wields considerable power behind the scenes, and whose lucrative activities were in one way or another disrupted by each of these four presidents. The pirates had, in each case, located a person who had a reason to hate the president and manipulated him into unknowingly carrying out their design. Other presidents, like Woodrow Wilson during World War I and Franklin Roosevelt in World War II, knew of this Commonwealth, recognized its secret role and made secret use of it – and thus avoided being assassinated. The book's plot hinges on a page torn from the Congressional Record, confirming that Congress in the early years of the US did give this Commonwealth "a perpetual authorization" to act as privateers. Once the current president's agent has located and destroyed this document, ensuring that this piece of secret history will remain forever secret, the president is free to act decisively and break up the pirate Commonwealth. Other Steve Berry books feature such pieces of secret history as treasure hidden by Napoleon Bonaparte, secret survivals of the Knights Templar, and the fate of the books of the Great Library of Alexandria.
 The first series of Blackadder, in which Henry VII of England comes to power in a completely different way and removes the reign of "Richard IV" from the history books. Note that in recorded history England had only three kings named Richard.
 The same Vidal book also asserts that the Greek philosopher Democritus had a far-traveling great-uncle who had visited both India and China, spoke their languages fluently and had met and conversed with their important sages such as the Buddha and Mahavira in India as well as Lao Tsu, and Confucius in China. The uncle was especially impressed by Confucius, became his disciple for several years, and was among the inner circle of close disciples who heard the basic tenets of Confucianism set out for the first time by the Master himself. In his old age, the great-uncle lived in Athens and dictated his autobiography – including detailed accounts of his conversations with the Eastern Sages – to the young Democritus, destined to himself become a major, highly influential philosopher. This would imply that, through that conduit, the Eastern Sages had much more of a direct influence on Greek philosophy than modern scholars realize.    
 Umberto Eco's novel Baudolino suggests that Emperor Frederick I, who died while on the Second Crusade, had not drowned in a river, as history records. Rather, he had died mysteriously at night while hosted at the castle of a sinister Armenian noble. According to the book, the only people who knew the truth had an excellent reason to hide it – since they had been in charge of guarding the Emperor, and if the truth became known they might have been executed out of hand for failing in their task.

Secret histories of fictional worlds
"Retcon", alteration of the canonical account of past events in serial fiction, often employs aspects of secret history. A seeming continuity breach might be "revealed" to alter the truth of what readers were previously led to believe was a definitive story. A retcon might equally well convert an established history into a secret history. Such transformations occur with particular frequency in long-running superhero comic books.

Examples
Another example in Doctor Who is the War Doctor, whose existence had been covered up by previous Doctors and was retroactively inserted into continuity by showrunner Steven Moffat to create a "mayfly" Doctor for "The Day of the Doctor".
 Brandon Sanderson's novella Mistborn: Secret History recounts the story of the first Mistborn trilogy from the perspective of a certain character working from behind the scenes to affect the outcome of the aforementioned trilogy, providing explanations for certain events that occur.
 DC Comics' Crisis on Infinite Earths made years of "established" events and characters from the DC Universe (for example the existence of Krypto) "un-happen". In the revised continuity only a few privileged characters remember the old continuity, making it "secret".
 Philip José Farmer's The Other Log of Phileas Fogg reinterprets Jules Verne's famous tale with the assumption that in fact Fogg was the immortal foster child of a race of hominid aliens known as the Eridani, and that his travel around the world was part of a secret mission on their behalf.
 Philip Jose Farmer's Wold Newton universe heavily influenced Alan Moore's subsequent League of Extraordinary Gentlemen. Both these universes tie together many disparate fictional creations in a variety of surprising ways.
 The Doctor Who serial Remembrance of the Daleks also alludes to hidden fictional history, establishing that during the events of the serial An Unearthly Child, the First Doctor had in his possession a super-weapon, the Hand of Omega stolen from his own people, the Time Lords. The story also implies that he knew of the Daleks before he "first" met them.
 Warren Ellis's comic book series Planetary offers a secret history look at the origin of comic book and literary type superheroes.
 When Arthur Conan Doyle wrote The Final Problem he fully intended to kill off Sherlock Holmes and write no further books and stories about him. Faced with massive pressure and protests by the famous detective's fans, he finally gave in. "The Adventure of the Empty House" revealed that Holmes did not die after all, and recounted a secret history of three years in which Holmes had been wandering the world while everybody – including even his close friend Dr. Watson – believed him to be dead. What differentiates this case from many other retcons and reboots is the fact that Sir Arthur Conan Doyle did not need to alter the initial stories in any way, since he had never given any substantial evidence that Sherlock Holmes died, in the first place: the "death" of the Great Detective was only a mistake on the part of the police and Dr Watson who misread the signs on the place of his apparent death.

Time travel secret histories

The plots of some time travel books and stories make it possible to count them as secret histories as well – since they posit that the truth about various historical figures and events is quite different from what history books recount.

For example, Poul Anderson's story Brave to be a King asserts that King Cyrus the Great, founder of the Persian Empire, was, in fact, a twentieth-century American time traveler stranded in the past who became a king by strange circumstances. (However, this is "cancelled out" at the end of the story, when the real Cyrus is restored to the timeline, and the American goes home to his own century.) Another Anderson story, The Sorrow of Odin the Goth, asserts that also the Nordic god Odin/Wodan was a twentieth-century American time traveler, who sought to study the culture of the ancient Goths and ended up being regarded as a god and starting an enduring myth.

Paul Levinson's The Plot to Save Socrates claims (as its title suggests) that the philosopher Socrates did not drink hemlock, as history tells. Rather, a clone died in his place and the true Socrates lived some more years in twenty-first century America. Also according to the same book, the politician and general Alcibiades had a long life and many adventures after the moment when history records his death; Alcibiades' mistress Timandra and the famous  fourth-century  mathematician Hypatia of Alexandria were one and the same person, a time-traveling American woman; the inventor Hero of Alexandria was also an American time traveler; and finally, according to the same book, the  nineteenth-century publisher William Henry Appleton had an extensive secret life as a time traveler, had visited Classical Greece and met some of the famous ancient Greek writers and philosophers whose works he published, and also several times visited the twenty-first century – but always found his own nineteenth-century milieu to be the most congenial.

According to David Drake's novel Birds of Prey, the Roman Empire's Third Century Crisis was far more severe than modern historians realize, and the Empire was on the verge of final collapse and disintegration already then. The situation was saved by a time traveler from the very far future, endowed with telepathic and other superhuman powers. That traveler encountered a young junior Roman officer named Diocletian, realized his enormous potential and gave him the final push to eventually become a strong Emperor, revive and restructure the Roman Empire and give it another two hundred years of life (and much longer for its eastern portion). Diocletian himself was completely unaware of this crucial help to his career.

Ray Nelson's novel Blake's Progress posits that the poet William Blake and his wife Kate were accomplished time travelers who had many adventures in past and future times and in various alternate timelines, their actions profoundly affecting the course of human history. They had a child never known to recorded history, since the child – also a time traveler – was born in the distant past and lived out his life in the distant future. While it is well known that Blake revered the poetry of John Milton, the book discloses that the two of them often met personally – the century separating them being no hindrance since Milton, too, was a time traveler and both could travel freely over millions of years. William Blake's mythology, the novel suggests, is not fictional but features actual people – or beings – whom Blake met on his wanderings through time. The character Urizen was in fact Blake's own son, born of a relationship with a woman of the far future. In addition to all the above, the book makes the more mundane assertion that many of the engravings attributed to Blake were in fact made by Kate and that in fact she was the better engraver of the two.

According to Michael Moorcock's Behold the Man, also Jesus Christ was a modern time traveler. His real name was Karl Glogauer, and he had a troubled life in 20th century London, being obsessed with the character of Jesus and finally getting and taking a chance to board a time machine to Jesus' time. Finding the Virgin Mary to be a nymphomaniac and having sex with her, he discovers that her child Jesus is a profoundly intellectually disabled hunchback who incessantly repeats the only word he knows: Jesus, Jesus, Jesus and could never have done any of the things attributed to the New Testament's Jesus Christ. Thereupon, he decides to take up the role himself, gathers disciples and enacts many of the acts attributed to Jesus, and finally ends up on the cross. In the pain of his last moments he cries out in English "It's a lie... it's a lie... it's a lie..." which Aramaic-speaking listeners understand as the famous Eloi, eloi, lama sabachthani.

See also
 Furtive fallacy
 Historical fantasy
 Wainscot (fiction)

Notes 

 
Continuity (fiction)
Fantasy tropes
Narratology
Alternate history
Speculative fiction